The Coastal Carolina Chanticleers football statistical leaders are individual statistical leaders of the Coastal Carolina Chanticleers football program in various categories, including passing, rushing, receiving, total offense, defensive stats, and kicking. Within those areas, the lists identify single-game, single-season, and career leaders. The Chanticleers represent Coastal Carolina University in the NCAA Division I Sun Belt Conference. Coastal joined the Sun Belt for non-football sports in 2016, began play in Sun Belt football in the second year of its transition to the Football Bowl Subdivision in 2017, and became a full FBS member in 2018.

Coastal Carolina began competing in intercollegiate football in 2003. This means that full box scores are available for all games, and there is no pre-modern era with incomplete statistics like there is for many college football teams. However, there are more entries on this list in more recent years, as the Chanticleers have played in more games per season, giving players more chances to accumulate statistics. Regular seasons in the NCAA Division I Football Championship Subdivision, in which Coastal participated from the program's creation in 2003 through 2016, normally consist of 11 games, instead of the 12 games allowed to FBS teams. However, two aspects of the FCS season structure allow the possibility of more games:
 First, the NCAA allows FCS programs to schedule 12 games instead of the regular 11 in years when the period starting with the Thursday before Labor Day and ending with the final Saturday in November contains 14 Saturdays. During Coastal's tenure in FCS, this happened in 2008, 2013, and 2014.
 More significantly, the FCS conducts a championship tournament, currently known as the NCAA Division I Football Championship. From 2003 through 2009, the tournament involved 16 teams. It expanded to 20 teams in 2010, and to its current 24 teams in 2013. Currently, a team that advances to the FCS championship game will play either four or five games, depending on whether it receives a first-round bye.

Under original head coach David Bennett, the Chanticleers were able to schedule 12 regular-season games once, reached the FCS playoffs twice in nine years, and averaged 11.3 games per season. Under Joe Moglia, head coach from 2012 to 2018 (with a medical leave in 2017), the Chanticleers were able to schedule 12 regular-season games twice as an FCS program, reached the FCS playoffs all four seasons in which they were eligible (due to their FBS transition, they were ineligible for the 2016 playoffs), and played in 13.2 games per season.

The Chanticleers were only able to play 11 regular-season games instead of the normal 12 in 2020 due to COVID-19, and an outbreak of cases in the team forced the cancellation of the 2020 Sun Belt Championship Game, for which it had qualified. Coastal has played two bowl games since moving to FBS—the 2020 and 2021 Cure Bowls.

These lists are updated through Coastal's game against Appalachian State on November 3, 2022.

Passing

Passing yards

Passing touchdowns

Rushing

Rushing yards

Rushing touchdowns

Receiving

Receptions

Receiving yards

Receiving touchdowns

Total offense
Total offense is the sum of passing and rushing statistics. It does not include receiving or returns.

Total offense yards

Touchdowns responsible for
"Touchdowns responsible for" is the official NCAA term for combined passing and rushing touchdowns.

Defense

Interceptions

Tackles

Sacks

Kicking

Field goals made

Field goal percentage

References

Coastal Carolina